Chal-e Sangha (also Romanized as Chāl-e Sanghā) is a village in Lalar and Katak Rural District, Chelo District, Andika County, Khuzestan Province, Iran. In the 2006 census, its population was 88, in fourteen families.

References 

Populated places in Andika County